Jakub or Jakob Polak may refer to:
 Jakub Polak (musician) (c. 1545–c. 1605), Polish musician
 Jakob Eduard Polak (1818–1891), Austrian physician active in Iran
 Jakub Polák (anarchist) (1952–2012), Czech anarchist and Roma rights activist